Herzlake is a municipality in the Emsland district, in Lower Saxony, Germany.

Villages are situated in Herzlake 

 Bookhof
 Felsen
 Herzlake
 Neuenlande
 Westrum

References
External Links

 Herzlake Notgeld (Emergency banknotes) 

Emsland